Highway 149 (AR 149, Ark. 149, and Hwy. 149) is a north–south state highway in northeast Arkansas. The route of  runs from Highway 38 in Hughes north across Interstate 40 (I-40) to I-555/US 63 Business (I-555/US 63B) in Marked Tree.

Route description

The route begins in Hughes at Highway 38 and runs northeast across US Route 79 (US 79) at North Hughes. Highway 149 continues north to Greasy Corner, where a  concurrency begins with Highway 50 west along a bayou. After the concurrency ends, Highway 149 turns due north and runs through fields. US 70/AR 149 run briefly as a frontage road for Interstate 40/US 79 (I-40/US 79) before Highway 149 turns north and runs over the limited-access route. Shortly after this junction the route enters Crittenden County and runs north to Earle.

In Earle Highway 149 has a short officially designated exception over U.S. Route 64B (US 64B). The concurrent routes passes near the Crittenden County Museum, listed on the National Register of Historic Places (NRHP)  before Highway 149 turns north onto Barton Street, ending the concurrency. Highway 149 has a junction with US 64 just prior to leaving Earle, and the highway passes the George Berry Washington Memorial (also NRHP-listed) shortly after leaving the city. The road curves through Arkansas delta countryside to a concurrency with Highway 42, beginning at Three Forks. Upon entering Poinsett County, Highway 149 serves as the western terminus of Highway 322 at Mt. Olive. The road continues north to enter Marked Tree, where it terminates at I-555/US 63B.

Major intersections
Mile markers reset at concurrencies.

|-
| colspan=5 align=center |  concurrency west, 

|-
| colspan=4 align=center |  concurrency east,

See also

 List of state highways in Arkansas

References

External links

149
Transportation in St. Francis County, Arkansas
Transportation in Crittenden County, Arkansas
Transportation in Poinsett County, Arkansas